The Bugle from Gutian is a 2019 Chinese historical film directed by Chen Li and starring Wang Renjun, Wang Zhifei, Liu Zhiyang, Hu Bing, Zhang Yishan, Sun Weimin, and Li Youbin. It is produced jointly by August First Film Studio and Fujian Film Studio. It is based on the 1929 Gutian Congress. The film premiered in China on August 1, 2019, to commemorate the establishment of 70th anniversary of the People's Republic of China.

Cast
 Wang Renjun as Mao Zedong 
 Wang Zhifei as Zhu De
 Liu Zhiyang as Chen Yi
 Hu Bing as Liu Angong
 Zhang Yishan as Lin Biao
 Sun Weimin as Tailor Lin
 Li Youbin as boss of paper mill 
 Dong Yue as He Zizhen
 Zou Xianyu

Production
This film was shot in Fujian province.

Release
The film premiered at the Great Hall of the People on July 26, 2019, and opened in China on August 1, 2019.

Reception
Douban, the influential Chinese film reviews website, gave the drama 6.5 out of 10.

Accolades

References

External links
 
 
 

2019 films
2010s Mandarin-language films
Chinese historical films
Films set in Fujian
Films shot in Fujian
2010s historical films